The 2018 King George VI and Queen Elizabeth Stakes was a horse race held at Ascot Racecourse on Saturday 28 July 2018. It was the 68th running of the King George VI and Queen Elizabeth Stakes.

The winner was Poet's Word, a five-year-old bay horse trained at Newmarket by Michael Stoute, ridden by James Doyle and owned by Saeed Suhail. Poet's Word's victory was the first in the race for both his owner and jockey. Stoute was winning the race for a record sixth time following his successes with Shergar (1981), Opera House (1993), Golan (2002), Conduit (2009) and Harbinger (2010). Poet's Word was the sixth five-year-old male to win the race following Aggressor, Mtoto, Opera House, Swain and Daylami.

The contenders
The race attracted a field of seven runners, five from England and two from Ireland. There were no challengers from continental Europe.

The race appeared to be sub-standard by King George standards as the only previous Group one winners in the race were Poet's Word, an improving five-year-old who had defeated Cracksman in the Prince of Wales's Stakes at Royal Ascot, and the Irish trained filly Hydrangea who had won the Matron Stakes and the British Champions Fillies & Mares Stakes in 2017. Another major contender was Crystal Ocean, a stablemate of Poet's Word, who had finished runner-up in the St Leger and recorded an impressive victory in the Hardwicke Stakes. John Gosden, who had won the race in 2017 with Enable was represented by Coronet, a four-year-old filly who won the Ribblesdale Stakes as a three-year-old and had been narrowly beaten in the Grand Prix de Saint-Cloud. The only three-year-old in the field was Rotropovich, trained like Hydrangea by Aidan O'Brien, who had finished second in the Irish Derby. The other two runners were Salouen (runner-up to Cracksman in the Coronation Cup) and Desert Encounter.

Crystal Ocean was made the 6/4 favourite ahead of Poet's Word on 7/4, Coronet on 15/2, Hydrangea on 10/1 and Rostropovich on 12/1.

The race
Rotropovich took the early lead and set a strong pace from Salouen and Crystal Ocean. Hydrangea was settled in fourth place ahead of Coronet and Poet's Word while Desert Encounter started slowly and trailed the field. Shortly after entering the straight, Crystal Ocean overtook the weakening Rostropovich and opened up a clear advantage. Hydrangea was already well beaten and Salouen was unable to improve his position but Coronet began to stay on strongly. The only serious challenger to Crystal Ocean was Poet's Word who moved up on the wide outside and joined his stablemate a furlong from the finish. In a keenly contested struggle Poet's Word prevailed by a neck, with a gap of nine lengths back to Coronet in third. Four lengths back Salouen narrowly secured fourth place from Rostropovich while there were long gaps back to Desert Encounter and the tailed-off Hydrangea.

Race details
 Sponsor: QIPCO
 Purse: £1,229,625; First prize: £708,875
 Surface: Turf
 Going: Good to Firm
 Distance: 12 furlongs
 Number of runners: 7
 Winner's time: 2:25.84

Full result

 Abbreviations: nse = nose; nk = neck; shd = head; hd = head

Winner's details
Further details of the winner, Poet's Word
 Sex: Horse
 Foaled: 5 April 2013
 Country: Ireland
 Sire: Poet's Voice
 Owner: Saeed Suhail
 Breeder: Woodcote Stud

References

King George
 2018
King George VI and Queen Elizabeth Stakes
2010s in Berkshire
King George VI